The Departments of the Second Mexican Empire were the administrative divisions that the nation was organized into during the short rule of Emperor Maximilian. He commissioned Mexican scholar Manuel Orozco y Berra to redraw boundaries based on geography. Each department was to be governed by a prefect, though the entire nation was never able to be administered by the imperial government due to an ongoing war against supporters of the Mexican Republic.

List of Departments

The information from this table was the estimate for the year 1865.

See also
 List of states of Mexico

References

 
 
First-level administrative divisions by country